Maruya is a type of fritter from the Philippines. It is usually made from saba bananas. The most common variant is prepared by coating thinly sliced  and "fanned" bananas in batter and deep frying them. They are then sprinkled with sugar. Though not traditional, they may also be served with slices of jackfruit preserved in syrup or ice cream. Maruya are commonly sold as street food and food sellers at outdoor though they are also popular as home-made merienda snacks among Filipinos.

Variants
A variant of maruya may also use dessert bananas, which are usually just mashed before mixing them with batter. They can also be made from sweet potatoes. Among Muslim Filipinos, this version is known as jampok, and traditionally use mashed Latundan bananas.

In the Bicol Region, it is also known as sinapot or baduya in the Bikol languages. Although this version does not "fan" the bananas. They are instead simply sliced lengthwise before frying in batter. It is also known as kumbo in the Western Visayas region.

Bunwelos na saging

A similar dessert to maruya is bunwelos na saging, which is more accurately a type of buñuelo (Spanish-derived flour doughnuts). It has more flour mixture than maruya. It also uses mashed ripe saba bananas rather than dessert bananas. It is made by mixing the bananas in flour, egg, and sugar, and then deep frying the mixture as little balls.

See also
 Banana cue
 Camote cue
 Ginanggang
 List of banana dishes
 Turrón

References

Philippine desserts
Snack foods
Street food
Deep fried foods
Doughnuts
Banana dishes
Philippine breads
Street food in the Philippines